Petar Jelenić (born 13 June 1987) is a retired Croatian tennis player. On 8 February 2010 he reached his highest ATP singles ranking of 467.

He made his only appearance on the ATP main tour as a wildcard at the 2010 PBZ Zagreb Indoors, losing in the second round to Michael Berrer. He was also number 7 (27/06/2005) in World Junior Rankings under 18.

References

External links

1987 births
Living people
Croatian male tennis players
Tennis players from Split, Croatia
21st-century Croatian people